The 1973–74 season was the 28th season in FK Partizan's existence. This article shows player statistics and matches that the club played during the 1973–74 season.

Players

Friendlies

Competitions

Yugoslav First League

Matches

Yugoslav Cup

See also
 List of FK Partizan seasons

References

External links
 Official website
 Partizanopedia 1973-74  (in Serbian)

FK Partizan seasons
Partizan